Bill Barwick (26 May 1905 – 16 June 1997) was an Australian middle-distance runner. He competed in the men's 1500 metres at the 1932 Summer Olympics.

References

1905 births
1997 deaths
Athletes (track and field) at the 1932 Summer Olympics
Australian male middle-distance runners
Olympic athletes of Australia
Place of birth missing
20th-century Australian people